In Switzerland, to identify individual aircraft, all military aircraft are allocated and display a serial number.

History

Pre Air Force Years to 1915
From 1900 to 1915 the Swiss Military had artillery observation balloons.
The balloons were usually referred to by a name, for example Vagabond, Bise, hair dryer, etc. The numbering of the balloon corps was autonomous and had nothing to do with the numbers of Fliegerabteilung (Air Force). The Balloons had the serials from 1 to 20.

The Swiss Air Force was founded in 1914.  The first Aircraft started with the serials 21, 22, 23, ..  In 1915 the Balloons get the prefix "K".
Some requisitioned Aircraft  don't get any serial number.

1915 to 1936 
The serial numbers were all without a prefix and reached from 21 to 873.

1936 to today

Aircraft serial numbering
The Swiss Air Force military aircraft are identified by a role prefix and number, the prefix or code identifies the role and the serial numbers the type or variant, the system was introduced in 1936.

Letter code
The letter or letters give the role of the aircraft.

This is followed by a number having from two to four digits.

Four-digit numbers 
The first digit identifies the aircraft type. The next three are for the sub-type and the individual aircraft, with the first and sometimes second for the subtype; and the third and sometimes fourth for the individual aircraft, In the following examples, "x" identifies the individual aircraft:
Mirage IIIBS = J-200x
Mirage IIIDS = J-201x
Mirage IIIRS = R-21xx
Mirage IIIC = J-22xx
Mirage IIIS = J-23xx
F-5E = J-30xx (serials previously used for the FFA P-16)
F-5F = J-32xx

Three-digit numbers 
Most aircraft have three numbers. These follow a broadly similar pattern to the four-digit numbers, although there are exceptions.

Transport aircraft have a first digit of 3 for helicopters and 7 for fixed wing aircraft.

Two-digit numbers 
Target drones have only two numbers.

Using of civil serial by  Military Aviation 

Until 2005 it was possible that the Swiss Air Force used for its VIP aircraft  a military aircraft serial T-XXX  or a civil serial HB-XXX. Since 2005 all Swiss Air Force VIP aircraft have only military aircraft serials.  For e.g. Cessna 560XL  former HB-VAA  now T-784.

Armasuisse 
Armasuisse belongs, like the Air Force, to the Defense Department.  Armasuisse Operates tree aircraft, two of them have a civil aircraft serials ( Pilatus PC-6  HB-FCF   and Pilatus PC-12 HB-FOG) and one with a military aircraft serial  (Diamond DA42 R-711).

See also 
List of aircraft of the Swiss Air Force
United Kingdom military aircraft serials
Portuguese military aircraft serials
Belgian aircraft registration and serials

References

    List of Swiss military aircraft serials

Serial numbers
Aircraft markings
Swiss Air Force